Ifira Black Bird is an association football club from the island of Ifira in the southwest of Vanuatu. Ifira is one of the top clubs in the Port Vila Football League.

Honours
Port Vila Football League - 2017, 2020, 2022
PVFA Cup - Runners-up: 2014
VVF National Super League: 2022

Current squad
Squad for 2019-20 Port Vila Premier League

References

Football clubs in Vanuatu
Port Vila